The 10th Seiyu Awards was held on March 12, 2016 at the JOQR Media Plus Hall in Minato, Tokyo.

First Group
The winners of the first group were announced on the ceremony day.

2nd Group
The winners of the Merit/Achievement Awards, the Synergy Award, the Kei Tomiyama Award, the Kazue Takahashi Award, and the Special Award were announced on February 16, 2016. The winner of the Kids Family Award was announced on the ceremony day.

References

Seiyu Awards ceremonies
Seiyu
Seiyu
2016 in Japanese cinema
2016 in Japanese television